Los Tigres del Norte at Folsom Prison is a 2019 documentary directed by Tom Donahue and starring Los Tigres del Norte. The premise revolves around  Los Tigres del Norte performing at Folsom State Prison in California, USA fifty years after Johnny Cash held his historic concert there. The film was released on September 15, 2019, on Netflix.

References

External links
 
 

2019 documentary films
2019 films
Spanish-language Netflix original films
2010s Spanish-language films
American documentary films
Films directed by Tom Donahue (filmmaker)
2010s American films